Memory improvement is the act of enhancing one's memory. Memory deficits, age-related memory loss, and people's want to improve their own memory have led to research on how to best help people to improve their memory. Research has also worked to determine what factors influence memory and cognition. Many different techniques to improve memory have been found, including cognitive training, psychopharmacology, diet, stress management, and exercise. Each technique has the ability to influence memory in different ways.

Memory function factors

Neuroplasticity
Neuroplasticity is the mechanism by which the brain encodes experience, learns new behaviours and relearns lost behaviour if the brain has been damaged.

Experience-dependent neuroplasticity suggests that the brain changes in response to what it experiences. London taxicab drivers provide a great example of this dynamic. They undergo extensive training for 2–4 years, learning and memorizing street names, layout of streets within the city and the quickest cross-city routes.  After studying London taxicab drivers over a period of time, it was found that the grey matter volume increased over time in the posterior hippocampus, an area in the brain involved heavily in memory. The longer taxi drivers navigated the streets of London, the greater the posterior hippocampal gray matter volume.  This suggests a correlation between a healthy person's mental training or exercise and their brains capacity to manage greater volume and more complex information. The increase in volume actually led to a decrease in the taxi drivers' ability to acquire new visuo-spatial information.

Stress
Research has found that chronic and acute stress have adverse effects on memory processing systems. Therefore, it is important to find mechanisms in which one can reduce the amount of stress in their lives when seeking to improve memory.

 Chronic stress has been shown to have negative impacts on the brain, especially in memory processing systems. The hippocampus is vulnerable to repeated stress due to adrenal steroid stress hormones.  Elevated glucocorticoids, a class of adrenal steroid hormones, results in increased cortisol, a well known stress response hormone in the brain, and glucocorticoids are known to affect memory. Prolonged high cortisol levels, as seen in chronic stress, have been shown to result in reduced hippocampal volume as well as deficits in hippocampal-dependent memory, as seen in impaired declarative, episodic, spatial, and contextual memory performance.  Chronic, long-term high cortisol levels affect the degree of hippocampal atrophy, resulting in as much as a 14% hippocampal volume reduction and impaired hippocampus-dependent memory when compared to elderly subjects with decreased or moderate cortisol levels. Relative to other brain regions, the hippocampus has a high concentration of glucocorticoid receptors. An example may be found in the London taxi drivers, as the anterior hippocampus was hypothesized to decrease in volume as a result of elevated cortisol levels from stress.
 Acute stress, a more common form of stress, results in the release of adrenal steroids resulting in impaired short-term and working memory processes such as selective attention, memory consolidation, as well as long-term potentiation.  The human brain has a limited short-term memory capacity to process information, which results in constant competition between stimuli to become processed. Cognitive control processes such as selective attention reduce this competition by prioritizing where attentional resources are distributed.  Attention is crucial in memory processing and enhances encoding and strength of memory traces. It is therefore important to selectively attend to relevant information and ignore irrelevant information in order to have the greatest success at remembering.

Animal and human studies provide evidence as they report that acute stress impairs the maintenance of short-term memory and working memory and aggravates neuropsychiatric disorders involved in short-term and working memory such as depression and schizophrenia. Animal studies with rats have also shown that exposure to acute stress reduces the survival of hippocampal neurons.

One of the roles of the central nervous system (CNS) is to help adapt to stressful environments. It has been suggested that acute stress may have a protective function for individuals more vulnerable to their own stress hormones. Some individuals, for example, are not able to decrease or habituate their cortisol elevation, which plays a major role in hippocampal atrophy. This over-response of the central nervous system to stress therefore causes maladaptive chronic stress-like effects to memory processing systems.

Strategies

Cognitive training
Discovering that the brain can change as a result of experience has resulted in the development of cognitive training. Cognitive training improves cognitive functioning, which can increase working memory capacity and improve cognitive skills and functions in clinical populations with working memory deficiencies.  Cognitive training may focus on attention, speed of processing, neurofeedback, dual-tasking and perceptual training.

Cognitive training has been shown to improve cognitive abilities for up to five years. In one experiment, the goal was to prove that cognitive training would increase the cognitive functions in older adults by using three types of training (memory, reasoning and speed of processing). It was found that improvements in cognitive ability not only was maintained over time but had a positive transfer effect on everyday functioning. Therefore, these results indicate that each type of cognitive training can produce immediate and lasting improvements in each kind of cognitive ability, thus suggesting that training can be beneficial to improving memory.

Cognitive training in areas other than memory has actually been seen to generalize and transfer to memory systems. For example, the Improvement in Memory with Plasticity-based Adaptive Cognitive Training (IMPACT) study by the American Geriatrics Society in 2009 demonstrated that cognitive training designed to improve accuracy and speed of the auditory system presented improvements in memory and attention system functioning as well as auditory functioning.

Two cognitive training methods are:

 Strategy training is used to help individuals remember increasing amounts of information of a particular type. It involves teaching effective approaches to encoding, maintenance, and/or recall from working memory. The main goal of strategy training is to increase performance in tasks requiring retention of information. Studies strongly support the claim that the amount of information remembered can be increased by rehearsing out loud, telling a story with stimuli, or using imagery to make stimuli stand out. Strategy training has been used in children with Down syndrome and also in older adult populations.
 Core training involves repetition of demanding working memory tasks.  Some core training programs involve a combination of several tasks with widely varying stimulus types. The diversity of exercises increase the chance that one of, or some combination of the training tasks, will produce desired training-related gains. A goal of cognitive training is to impact the ease and success of cognitive performance in one's daily life. Core training can reduce the symptoms of attention deficit hyperactivity disorder (ADHD) and improve the quality of life involving patients with multiple sclerosis, schizophrenia and also, those who have suffered from stroke.

The manner in which a training study is conducted could affect the outcomes or perspection of the outcomes. Expectancy/effort effects occur when the experimenter subconsciously influences the participants to perform a desired result. One form of expectancy bias relates to placebo effects, which is the belief that training should have a positive influence on cognition.  A control group may help to eliminate this bias because this group would not expect to benefit from the training.  Researchers sometimes generalize their results, which can be misleading and incorrect.  An example is to generalize findings of a single task and interpret the observed improvements as a broadly defined cognitive ability.  The study may result in inconsistency if there are a variety of comparison groups used in working memory training, which is impacted by: training and assessment timeline, assessment conditions, training setting and control group selection.

The Five x Five System is a set of memory enhancement tools that are scientifically validated. The system was created by Dr Peter Marshall for research purposes at Royal Holloway, University of London. The system involves 5 groups of 5 tactics designed to maximise storage and recall at each stage of the process of registering, short-term storage, long-term storage, consolidation and retrieval and was designed to test efficacy of including memory training in school curricula.  Each section is of equal text length so that it can be taught verbatim in the same amount of time by all competent teachers.

Personal Application & Intellectual Conception 
Testing Effect is when most of the learning is allocated to declarative knowledge long term memory is enhanced, this is otherwise known as the testing effect . In order to retrieve information from your memory you must practice doing it.  The more frequent practicing memorizing the more capable and likely you are to remember it later. The development of an effective retrieval structure that makes it easier to access information that has been stored in long-term memory is facilitated by using repeated retrieval practice. Testing effect occurs because of  the development of an adequate retrieval structure. The testing effect is different from re-reading because the information being learned is being practiced and tested which forces the information to be drawn from memory to recall. The testing effect allows for information to be recalled over a longer period as it is used as a self-testing tool and aids in having the ability to recall information in the future. This strategy is effective when using memory recall especially for information that is being tested on and needs to be in long-term memory.

Concept Maps “are diagrams that link word concepts in a fluid manner to central key concepts.”  They center around a main topic or idea, with lines protruding from the center with related information. Other concepts and ideas are then written at the end of each of the lines with new, related information. These related ideas are usually one or two words in length, giving only the essence of what is needed for memory retrieval. Related ideas can also be drawn at the ends of the lines. This may be especially useful, given the drawing effect (people remember images better than words). These diagrams are beneficial because they require the creator to link and integrate different ideas, which improve critical thinking and leads to more meaningful learning. Concept maps also help to facilitate the storage of material in long term memory, as well as help to show visually any knowledge gaps that may be present. Concept maps have been shown to improve people's ability to complete novel problem solving tasks.

The Drawing Effect is another way to improve memory. Studies show that images are better remembered than words, something that is now known as the picture-superiority effect. Furthermore, another study found that when people are studying vocabulary, they remember more when they draw the definition, in comparison to writing it. This is thought to be because drawing uses 3 different types of memory- elaborative, motor, and pictorial. The benefit of using pictures to enhance memory is even seen at an older age, including in dementia patients.

Techniques to improve memory: visual memory 

Method of loci is a technique utilized for memory recall when to-be-remembered items are associated with different locations that are well known to the learner. Method of loci is one of the oldest and most effective mnemonics based on visual imagery. The more you exercise your visual memory through using objects to recall information better memory recall you will have. The locations that are utilized when using the method of loci aids in the effectiveness of memory recall. For example, using the location of a driving route to work is more effective than using a room within a home because items in a room can be moved around while a route to work is more constant without items being moved around. There are limitations when using method of loci, it is difficult to recall any given item without working your way through the list sequence, which can be time consuming. Another limitation is that it is not useful when an individual is trying to learn and remember the real world. This mnemonic technique plus others are effective because they allow the learner to apply their own knowledge to enhance their memory recall.

Psychopharmacology

Psychopharmacology is the scientific study of the actions of drugs and their effects on mood, sensation, thought, and behavior.

Evidence that aspects of memory can be improved by action on selective neurotransmitter systems, such as the cholinergic system which releases acetylcholine, has possible therapeutic benefits for patients with cognitive disorders.

Findings from studies have indicated that acute administration of nicotine can improve cognitive performance (particularly tasks that require attention), short-term episodic memory and prospective memory task performance.  Chronic usage of low-dose nicotine in animals has been found to increase the number of neuronal nicotinic acetylcholine receptors (nAChRs) and improve performance on learning and memory tasks.

Short-term nicotine treatment, utilising nicotine skin patches, have shown that it may be possible to improve cognitive performance in a variety of groups such as normal non-smoking adults, Alzheimer's disease patients, schizophrenics, and adults with attention-deficit hyperactivity disorder. Similarly, evidence suggests that smoking improves visuospatial working memory impairments in schizophrenic patients, possibly explaining the high rate of tobacco smoking found in people with schizophrenia.

Diet
Food and memory may be connected. While no link has been isolated to prove a direct connection between diet and memory, there are several correlational studies to support the theory that food may affect memory.

Some foods may be tied to improving cognitive function. Foods rich in Omega-3 fatty acids have shown a correlation with improvements in memory and brain maintenance because they increase the brain’s cell membranes.  Foods high in Omega-3s include some fish and seafood, plant oils, seeds, and nuts.  Some of the B vitamins may also be associated with the brain and the decrease in the likelihood of the development of Alzheimer’s disease. Vitamin B6 can be found in high quantities in fish, organ meats like liver, starches, and fruits. It is the combination of these foods and their nutrients that seems to have the greatest impact on the brain. Some diets incorporate many of these foods and are therefore may be considered as a potential diet for helping brain functions like memory. The Mediterranean diet is the strongest contender for one of these diets that may be beneficial to the brain, but the data on the connection between memory and diet is not as certain as data on a diet that is known to be good for the heart. Some of the foods that are recommended in the Mediterranean diet are the same as ones already mentioned here such as fish, nuts, oil, fruits, and vegetables. This diet also recommends whole grains (a good source of vitamin E) and limiting the amount of red meat consumed.

Free radicals are a threat to memory processes because they cause oxidative stress. Antioxidants combat the effects that free radicals cause. It appears that foods that are high in antioxidants can provide the extra help that is needed in order to combat free radicals. Plant foods have antioxidants and seem to be more effective than their supplemental drug counterparts most likely because of the way the other nutrients contained within the food item combine to work in the body along with the antioxidant. Fruits and vegetables make the list of antioxidants alongside seafood, seeds, nuts, and protein sources like beef and poultry. Vitamin E is an antioxidant, and like Omega-3 fatty acids, vitamin E can also be found in seeds and nuts, plant oils, and fruits and vegetables.

In support of fruits and vegetables and their possible connection to aiding memory, a study found that men who ate more fruits and vegetables over the course of four years performed better on memory tests than the men who did not eat as many servings of fruit and vegetables daily.

Flavonoids may also help with preserving memory by protecting neurons in the brain and promoting regeneration. Some examples of foods with flavonoids are dark colored berries and dark chocolate.

While not a true element of diet, chewing on a piece of gum may also help to improve certain elements of episodic and working memory.

There is some evidence glucose consumption may have a positive impact on memory performance, though not in young adults.

Stress management

Meditation, a form of mental training to focus attention, has been shown to increase the control over brain resource distribution, improving both attention and self-regulation. The changes are potentially long-lasting as meditation may have the ability to strengthen neuronal circuits as selective attentional processes improve.  Meditation may also enhance cognitive limited capacity, affecting the way in which stimuli are processed.

Meditation practice has also been associated with physical changes in brain structure. Magnetic resonance imaging (MRI) of Buddhist insight meditation practitioners who practiced mindfulness meditation were found to have an increase in cortical thickness  and hippocampus volume compared to the control group.  This research provides structural evidence that meditation practice promotes neural plasticity and experience-dependent cortical plasticity.

Exercise

In both human and animal studies, exercise has been shown to improve cognitive performance on encoding and retrieval tasks. Morris water maze and radial arm water maze studies of rodents found that, when compared to sedentary animals, exercised mice showed improved performance traversing the water maze and displayed enhanced memory for the location of an escape platform. Likewise, human studies have shown that cognitive performance is improved due to physiological arousal, which speeded mental processes and enhanced memory storage and retrieval.  Ongoing exercise interventions have been found to favourably impact memory processes in older adults and children.

Exercise has been found to positively regulate hippocampal neurogenesis, which is considered an explanation for the positive influence of physical activities on memory performance. Hippocampus-dependent learning, for example, can promote the survival of newborn neurons which may serve as a foundation for the formation of new memories.  Exercise has been found to increase the level of brain-derived neurotrophic factor (BDNF) protein in rats, with elevated BDNF levels corresponding with strengthened performance on memory tasks. Data also suggests that BDNF availability at the beginning of cognitive testing is related to the overall acquisition of a new cognitive task and may be important in determining the strength of recall in memory tasks.

A meta-analysis concluded that specifically resistance training, as compared to cardiovascular exercise, had no measurable effect on working memory.

There is some evidence that also shows that the amount of effort put into exercising is positively correlated with the level of cognitive performance after working out both in the short term and long term.

Mental exercise
Aristotle wrote a treatise about memory: De memoria et reminiscentia.  To improve recollection, he advised that a systematic search should be made and that practice was helpful.  He suggested grouping the items to be remembered in threes and then concentrating upon the central member of each triad (group of three).

Music playing has recently gained attention as a possible way to promote brain plasticity. Promising results have been found suggesting that learning music can improve various aspects of memory. For instance, children who participated in one year of instrumental musical training showed improved verbal memory, whereas no such improvement was shown in children who discontinued musical training. Similarly, adults with no previous musical training who participated in individualized piano instruction showed significantly improved performance on tasks designed to test attention and working memory compared to a healthy control group. Evidence suggests that the improvements to verbal, working and long-term memory associated to musical training are a result of the enhanced verbal rehearsal mechanisms musicians possess.

Another study tested elderly participants in how learning a new activity impacts their memory and mental control. They were divided into 5 groups that each spent 15 hours a week doing one of 5 different scenarios: learning digital photography, learning to quilt, learning both digital photography and how to quilt, socializing with others, or doing solitary activities by themselves. It was found that all groups improved with regard to mental control, however learning a new skill(s) led to improved episodic memory.

Memory aids 

Physical memory aids, typically worn on the wrist or finger, can help the user remember something they might otherwise forget. Common aids such as this are used by people with memory loss. Typical memory aids for people with Alzheimer's includes sticky notes and color-coded memory aids. Tying a string around one's finger to remember something important is both a literary device, and an actual practice. One school yearbook from 1849 suggests using either a string tied around a finger or a knot tied in the corner of a handkerchief to remember something important to the student. The oldest documented legend of a string used as a memory aid was in the myth Ariadne's thread, where a thread was presented by Ariadne to her lover Theseus to find his way out of the minotaur's labyrinth. The knot-in-the-handkerchief memory aid was used by German philosopher Martin Heidegger.

A memory clamp (also called a "reality clamp") is a generic name for a type of physical memory aid designed be worn on the wrist or finger to help the user remember something they might otherwise forget, and was originally invented by physicist Rick Yukon to create difficult-to-ignore visuals and a deliberately intrusive shape and size. (For example, a child in a car seat, an important meeting, or the need to take one's own medicine.) A well designed memory clamp is designed to be difficult to ignore visually, typically with bright colors and sometimes contrasting base colors. A memory clamp is designed to cause a slight amount of visual discomfort and a slight amount of physical discomfort, so that the user maintains at least partial awareness of the intrusion, and is thus designed to be worn only intermittently, so the user doesn't become accustomed to it.

Other memory methods include writing on one's own hand, sending a text message to oneself, or using sticky notes. Wrist-worn, finger-worn and ankle-worn memory aids have apparently been used for hundreds of years.

See also
Cognitive enhancer
Effect of caffeine on memory
Emotion and memory
Music-related memory
Sleep and Memory
Spaced repetition
Working memory training

Notes

References

Memory
Neuroscience